Harm Jan Huidekoper (April 3, 1776 – May 22, 1854) was a businessman, philanthropist, essayist and lay theologian, a vice president of the American Unitarian Association, and a founder of the Meadville Theological School.

Early life 

Huidekoper was born in Hoogeveen, Drenthe province in the Dutch Republic. His parents were Anne Jans Huidekoper and his second wife Gesiena Frederica Wothers. 
He was educated in Hoogeveen and attended an Institute at Krefeld, Prussia (Germany).  After leaving Krefeld, Huidekoper spent time at home and in Amsterdam and then emigrated to America in August 1796.

Career 

Huidekoper first settled in the community of Dutch expatriates in Cazenovia, New York and worked there for John Lincklaen, the Holland Land Company agent for that area. Huidekoper then moved to nearby Barneveld, New York and in 1799 became the clerk for Adam Gerard Mappa who also worked for the Holland Land Company.  In Barneveld he became acquainted with François Adriaan van der Kemp and his political and religious views. In 1802 Huidekoper transferred to Philadelphia to become the assistant to Paul Busti, Agent General for the Holland Land Company holdings in America.

In 1802 he was sent to Meadville, Pennsylvania, to review the bookkeeping for the Holland Land Company land holdings in western Pennsylvania.

In 1804 the resident agent in Meadville resigned and Huidekoper moved to Meadville to succeed him. The clarification of land ownership rights under Pennsylvania law was an essential early task undertaken by Huidekoper.  This included clearing settlers without land titles from Holland Land Company land, a matter that was eventually decided by the U.S. Supreme Court in February 1805 in Huidekoper’s Lessee v. Douglass.

In 1836 Huidekoper purchased the remaining land tracts in western Pennsylvania from the Holland Land Company, approximately 58,300 acres (236 km2). He continued in this business until the end of his life. He died in Meadville in 1854.

Family 
Huidekoper married Rebecca Colhoon of Carlisle, Pennsylvania in 1806. They had seven children: Anna Appolina (1807–1808), Frederic Wolthers (1808–1816), Alfred (1810–1892), Edgar (1812–1862), Anna (1814–1897), Frederic (1817–1892), and Elizabeth Gertrude (1819–1908).  Huidekoper built an estate named Pomona Hall  near Meadville.

His descendants include Henry S. Huidekoper and Cora Huidekoper Clarke

Unitarianism 

Huidekoper became active in the Unitarian movement and wrote several essays that were distributed nationally.  He was a principal backer of the new Unitarian Church built in Meadville in 1835–1836.  In 1844 Huidekoper co-founded with his son Frederic Huidekoper the Meadville Seminary school, now part of Meadville Lombard Theological School in Chicago.

References

Further reading

External links

1776 births
1854 deaths
Dutch emigrants to the United States
People from Meadville, Pennsylvania
19th-century Unitarians